Robert Alphonso Taft Jr. (February 26, 1917 – December 7, 1993) was an American politician. He was a member of the Taft family who served as a Republican Congressman from Ohio between 1963 and 1965, as well as between 1967 and 1971. Taft also served as a U.S. Senator between 1971 and 1976.

Early life
Robert Alphonso Taft Jr. was born in Cincinnati, Ohio, on February 26, 1917, the second of four sons born to Robert Alphonso Taft Sr. and the former Martha Wheaton Bowers.  Robert Jr.'s paternal grandparents were President William Howard Taft and First Lady Helen Louise "Nellie" Herron while his maternal grandparents were Lloyd Wheaton Bowers (Solicitor General of the United States from 1909–1910) and Louisa Bennett Wilson. His older brother was William Howard Taft III, who served as Ambassador to Ireland from 1953 to 1957, while his younger brothers were Lloyd Bowers Taft, who worked as an investment banker in Cincinnati, and Horace Dwight Taft, who became a professor of physics and dean at Yale. Taft graduated from Yale University in 1939 and Harvard Law School in 1942.

Career
During World War II, Taft served as an officer in the United States Navy from 1942 to 1946. After law school, Taft joined the Cincinnati law firm, Taft, Stettinius, and Hollister, which had been founded by his father. Taft served in the Ohio House of Representatives from 1955 to 1962 until winning election to the United States House of Representatives. Taft won election to the United States House of Representatives in 1962 as an at-large representative from Ohio (at-large seats were barred by the Voting Rights Act).

In 1955 he became a compatriot of the Sons of the American Revolution.

In 1964, rather than running for re-election to the House, he ran for the U.S. Senate, but he lost to Stephen M. Young. In 1966, Taft returned to the House of Representatives, unseating Democratic incumbent (and future Governor of Ohio) John J. Gilligan. In 1968, Taft won re-election, defeating Democrat Carl F. Heiser. Taft then won Young's U.S. Senate seat six years after losing to him when Young did not run for re-election, running against Howard Metzenbaum. Taft, however, lost six years later in a rematch against Metzenbaum. He resigned six days before the end of his term to resume the practice of law.

Personal life
In 1939, Robert Jr. married Blanca Duncan Noel (1917–1968), daughter of Lewis W. Noel and Natalie Duncan. They were the parents of:
Robert Alphonso "Bob" Taft III (born 1942), Governor of Ohio from 1999 to 2007
Sarah Butler Taft
Deborah Taft
Jonathan Duncan Taft.
After Blanca's death, Robert Jr. remarried to Katherine Longworth Whittaker, widow of his distant cousin David Gibson Taft. They divorced in 1977 and in October 1978, he married the former Joan McKelvy, also of Cincinnati.

On November 29, 1993, Taft suffered a stroke and fell into a coma. He never woke from the coma and died on December 7, 1993. Joan died on January 16, 2015.

References

External links
 Last Salute 
 Unknown 
 
 Mike Haydock 
 Google Newspaper Archive 
 

Republican Party members of the Ohio House of Representatives
Taft family
American people of English descent
American people of Scotch-Irish descent
1917 births
1993 deaths
Taft School alumni
Harvard Law School alumni
Yale University alumni
Politicians from Cincinnati
Republican Party United States senators from Ohio
20th-century American politicians
Republican Party members of the United States House of Representatives from Ohio